Danielle Aykroyd (born November 18, 1989), known professionally as Vera Sola, is an American-Canadian singer-songwriter, multi-instrumentalist, and recording artist. She studied poetry under Jorie Graham at Harvard University. She performed, produced, and arranged everything on her debut album, which was self-released on November 9, 2018.

Biography 
Vera Sola was born Danielle Aykroyd to actor Dan Aykroyd and actress Donna Dixon, on November 18, 1989, in Los Angeles, California. She grew up between New York and Canada. She went to Saint Ann's School (Brooklyn) and graduated from Harvard with a degree in literature. After college, she worked on the radio and as a voice actor. She still provides commercial voice-overs and narration for television and film.

Sola is shy about her family by nature, and decided to distance herself from her recognizable name in order to establish a career in music on her own. She has also stated in interviews that, though she is proud of her lineage, she never really liked her name but never got around to changing it. The stage name came about as what she calls a "pretentious, sort of scathing inside joke with myself, albeit with a silver lining of sincerity."

Music career 
She did not consider taking up music seriously until a longtime friend, songwriter Elvis Perkins, encouraged her to join his touring band. She toured and recorded with Elvis throughout and after his "I Aubade" album cycle. She credits Elvis with bringing her on stage and still plays bass guitar among other instruments in his band.

It was not until February 2017 that, after suffering a series of life-changing events, she decided to pursue a solo career in music. She entered the studio to record Shades, and took the name Vera Sola shortly after. Sola performed, arranged, and produced the entire album independently, telling Flood Magazine about the process: “...it's the direct result of my reality, personal and global, going up in a dark and disorienting and sad and often very funny blaze...When I finally talked myself into making it, I thought I’d have friends come in and contribute, but the nature of things drew me ultimately towards playing and arranging it all. So...it’s an unbroken vessel of my own energy, for better or worse. It was pure expression without expectation. I never even planned to release it. But here we are.”

In October 2017, she released an EP of Misfits covers, titled Last Caress, which attracted the attention of industry professionals.

The first single from Shades was self-released through her Spectraphonic label in August 2018, which released the album on November 9, 2018. On it, she plays a number of unconventional instruments, including bones, chains and breaking glass.

Music blog The Line of Best Fit gave the album a 9/10, writing: "Such is the virtuosity and accomplishment of her playing, Shades is bound with the tight-knit swagger of a group of road wearied sessions players. It’s hard to believe it is the work of just one person." The Sunday Times called her "an undeniably singular talent" and called 'Shades' an essential new release.

French Music magazine Magic gave it a 6/6 and named it the number 2 record of the year calling it an "absolute masterpiece".

In November 2018, Rolling Stone Magazine named her one of "The Top Ten Country Artists You Need to Know", citing her sense of social conscience and comparing her voice to Nancy Sinatra.

Live performance 
Sola's stage presence has been referred to as hypnotic, "captivating; almost hallucinatory". She has been characterized as coming out of a David Lynch film. Even though she was not very well-known, her 2018 performance at the famed Le Guess Who? festival in the Netherlands received rave reviews. Greek blog ClockSound wrote:  "Her personal, theatrical and modern take on Americana and turn of the century (20s, not 21s) music has me hooked from the moment I walked into the Hertz...Her lyricism and the influence poetry have had on this strongly reminds me of – and this is coming from a very big fan – Leonard Cohen."

A live-performance review in Loud and Quiet magazine calls her "a Westworld android gone rogue; a living anachronism, capable of both run-of-the-mill stage banter and of occupying the characters of her songs with full force, moving as if possessed by them as she performs."

Sola has performed with many different musicians and instruments on stage, including a string quartet. She usually plays the guitar, which she plays with a unique finger-picking style.

She toured the United States opening for Sixto Rodriguez, subject of the Academy Award-winning documentary Searching for Sugar Man.

Sola performed at the Bombay Beach Biennale in March 2019, a three-day festival of art, music, and lectures in the Southern California desert.

References

External links 
 Official website

1989 births
Living people
American women singer-songwriters
Harvard University alumni
American folk musicians
American women poets
American voice actresses
21st-century American poets
Saint Ann's School (Brooklyn) alumni
American singer-songwriters
21st-century American women
Dan Aykroyd